This is a list of transactions that have taken place during the off-season and the 2017–18 NBA season.

Retirement

Front office movements

Head coach changes
In-season

General manager changes
Off-season

In-season

Player movement

Trades

Free agency

Free agency negotiation starts on Saturday, July 1, 2017. Players are allowed to sign new offers starting on July 6, after the July moratorium ended. The following players, who last played for an NBA team during the 2016–17 season, are scheduled to become free agents. All players became unrestricted free agents unless indicated otherwise. A restricted free agent's team has the right to keep the player by matching an offer sheet the player signs with another team.

* Player option
** Team option
*** Early termination option
**** Converted two-way contract to full contract

Going to other American leagues

Going overseas

Waived

† Two-way contract

Training camp cuts
All players listed did not make the final roster.

Draft

First round

Second round

Previous years' draftees

Renounced draft rights

Two-way contracts
Per recently implemented NBA rules, teams are permitted to have two two-way players on their roster at any given time, in addition to their 15-man regular season roster. A two-way player will provide services primarily to the team's G League affiliate, but can spend up to 45 days with the parent NBA team. Only players with four or fewer years of NBA experience are able to sign two-way contracts, which can be for either one season or two. Players entering training camp for a team have a chance to convert their training camp deal into a two-way contract if they prove themselves worthy enough for it. Teams also have the option to convert a two-way contract into a regular, minimum-salary NBA contract, at which point the player becomes a regular member of the parent NBA team. Two-way players are not eligible for NBA playoff rosters, so a team must convert any two-way players it wants to use in the playoffs. Two-way contracts must be signed prior to January 15, with their salaries being fully guaranteed on January 20. Every team would sign a two-way player at least twice throughout this season.

°Training camp conversion

See also

Notes

References

Transactions
NBA transactions